The 15th International Film Festival of India was held as IFFI' 92 during 10–20 January 1992 at Bengaluru. 

The festival was made interim non-competitive following a decision taken in August 1988 by the Ministry of Information and Broadcasting. The earlier "Filmotsavs" and IFFI 90-91-92 together constituted 23 editions of the festival, and the 1993 IFFI becoming the 24th edition.

Non-competitive sections
Cinema of The World
Indian Panorama – Feature Films
Indian Panorama – Non-Feature Films
Indian Panorama – Mainstream Films

References

1992 film festivals
15th
1992 in Indian cinema